Coiled-coil alpha-helical rod protein 1, also known as CCHCR1, is a protein which in humans is encoded by the CCHCR1 gene.

Gene 

The Human CCHCR1 gene is located at 6p21.33. It is also known as Coiled-Coil Alphahelical Rod Protein 1, C6orf18, Putative Gene 8 Protein, SBP, HCR (A-Helix Coiled-Coil Rod Homologue), pg8, StAR-Binding Protein, and Pg8.

Homology 
Homologes for CCHCR1 are conserved through tetrapods.

Paralogs

Orthologs 
CCHCR1 has orthologs throughout vertebrates.

Distant Homologs

Homologous Domains

Phylogeny 

Phylogenetic analysis with ClustalW indicated that CCHCR1

The CCHCR1 gene has

Protein

Structure 
The structure of CCHCR1 is primarily composed of alpha-helices, coils, and a small amount of beta sheets, according to PELE.

Expression

Function 

May be a regulator of keratinocyte proliferation or differentiation.

Interacting Proteins 

CCHCR1 has been shown to interact with POLR2C, 
KRT17
, TOP3B, Steroidogenic acute regulatory protein, TRAF4, HLA-C, TCF19, SNX29, EEF1D, and EEF1B2.

Clinical significance 

In genetically engineered mice, certain CCHCR1 polymorphisms cause upregulation of the expression of cytokeratins 6 (KRT6A), 16 (KRT16) and 17 (KRT17) and change in expression in other genes associated with terminal differentiation and formation of the cornified cell envelope.  These CCHCR1 polymorphisms may therefore be associated with a susceptibility to psoriasis. Defective functioning of CCHCR1 may lead to abnormal keratinocyte proliferation which is a key feature of psoriasis.

CCHCR1 polymorphisms have also been found to be associated with multiple sclerosis.

See also 
 Coiled coil

References

External links

Further reading